The 10th Inspection Commission of the Lao People's Revolutionary Party (LPRP) was elected at the 1st Plenary Session of the 10th LPRP Central Committee on 15 January 2021.

Members

References 

10th Inspection Commission of the Lao People's Revolutionary Party
2016 establishments in Laos
2021 disestablishments in Laos